Cathy Dunn (born May 16, 1949) is an American politician who served in the North Carolina Senate from the 33rd district from 2017 to 2019.

Electoral history

References

External links

1949 births
Living people
Republican Party North Carolina state senators